"The Clapping Song" is an American song, written by Lincoln Chase, originally arranged by Charles Calello and recorded by Shirley Ellis in 1965.

The single sold over a million copies, and peaked at number eight in the United States and number six in the UK.

Background
The song was released shortly after Ellis had released  "The Name Game". "The Clapping Song" incorporates lyrics from the song "Little Rubber Dolly" (which does not contain the ‘three six nine’ part) a 1930s song recorded by the Light Crust Doughboys, and also features instructions for a clapping game.

Chart performance

Notable cover versions

The song has been covered many times:
 Gary Glitter covered this song on three albums: Glitter in 1972, Glam Years 1991, and Gary Glitter in 1995
 Female Mexican pop singer Yuri recorded a Spanish version of the song in 1980 titled "Bailad (The Clapping Song)"
 Ian Cussick, Scottish singer-songwriter, released the song as a single in 1981, from his third studio album Hypertension
 The song returned to the charts when The Belle Stars covered the song in 1982, on their self-titled LP.  This version charted at number 11 in the UK, and number 4 in Australia. It was the 33rd biggest selling single in Australia in 1983.
 Les Surfs, a french singing band from Madagascar, recorded the french version titled Clac tape, released in France in 1965
 Pia Zadora's cover of the song entered the top 40 in 1983, when it peaked at number 36 on the Hot 100.
 Aaron Carter released a cover of the song on his 2000 album Aaron's Party (Come Get It). A music video was produced for the song.
 Lil' Kim performed the song (as Shirley Ellis) on the NBC drama American Dreams 12 October 2003 and danced to the song on the ABC show Dancing With The Stars 20 AND 21 April 2009
 Mother and The Addicts released a cover of this song as the B-side to 2004 single "Who Art You Girls?"
 The Young Punx covered the song for the  Buffet Libre 'Rewind 2' project in late 2008, featuring Laura Kidd on vocals and Guthrie Govan on guitar
 UK X Factor contestant, Cher Lloyd, performed the song on the final of the show in December 2010
 Russell Grant released it in 2012 in the UK as a Christmas single along with six backing singers/dancers, including S Club 7's Tina Barrett, Chloe Rich, Miriam Breckner and Rhiannon Drake
 The Hip-hop gospel Congolese group Makoma has covered the song
 Izza Kizza samples the chorus in his song "Walk The Dawg"
 R&B Singer Cupid did a cover of the song with B.o.B on the Step Up 2 OST which samples Ellis' version
 Operator Please covered the song for the Australian Independent teen film Hey, Hey, It's Esther Blueburger
 Baccara recorded a cover with a "Macarena" beat.
 Andrew W.K. included a re-mixed version in the album Damn! The Mixtape.
 On Season 1 of The X Factor US, the group InTENsity performed the song during the first live show
 The Hype Girlz released The Clapping Song on June 15, 2015
 Icona Pop released a cover on 17 July 2015 titled "Clap Snap" on the "Emergency EP"
 UK X Factor group 4th Impact performed the song as a mash-up with "Sound of the Underground" during the second week of live shows of Series 12, in 2015.
 Queen drummer Roger Taylor covered the song on his 2021 album Outsider. He released it as a single on 16 September 2021.

In media
"The Clapping Song" has been featured in the soundtracks of the movies Scratch, Because of Winn-Dixie, Private Life, Stuber, Poms, All Together Now, and Ghostbusters: Afterlife. 

In Flatliners, the song is sung by children on the playground.

On television, it was featured in Round Six of the 2009 season of Dancing With the Stars.

References

The Clapping Song Lyrics

1965 songs
Songs written by Lincoln Chase
Aaron Carter songs
1965 singles
Novelty songs
1983 singles
Pia Zadora songs